Tidal stripping occurs when a larger galaxy pulls stars and other stellar material from a smaller galaxy because of strong tidal forces.

An example of this scenario is the interacting pair of galaxies NGC 2207 and IC 2163, which are currently in the process of tidal stripping.

See also

 Galactic tide
 Interacting galaxy
 Galactic ram pressure stripping

References